Ian Price (born 19 June 1947) is a former  Australian rules footballer who played with South Melbourne in the Victorian Football League (VFL).

Notes

External links 

Living people
1947 births
Australian rules footballers from Victoria (Australia)
Sydney Swans players